Henry Hosford Gurley (May 20, 1788 – March 16, 1833) was a member of the U. S. House of Representatives representing the state of Louisiana. He served four terms in three parties.

Gurley was born in Lebanon, Connecticut, and attended Williams College.  He was first elected to Congress as an Adams-Clay Republican, then served two terms as an Adams candidate, and finally served one term as an anti-Jacksonian.  A collection of Gurley's papers between 1815 and 1831 is located in the Tulane University Special Collections.  Gurley served as a district judge in Louisiana following his term in Congress.

Family
Gurley married Lucy Goodwin of Boston, Massachusetts, on July 1, 1810.  She died in January 1830.  The couple had eight children—4 boys and 4 girls.

Gurley's brother, John Ward Gurley, served as the Territory of Orleans attorney general in 1803.

External links 
Bio at Congress.gov

1788 births
1833 deaths
People from Lebanon, Connecticut
American people of Scottish descent
Democratic-Republican Party members of the United States House of Representatives from Louisiana
National Republican Party members of the United States House of Representatives from Louisiana
Williams College alumni